Paul Carpenter (8 December 1921 – 12 June 1964) was a Canadian actor and singer.

Life and career
Carpenter originally attended medical school in Montreal, but left aged 17 to join the Canadian Broadcasting Corporation as a war correspondent. He also played professional hockey in Canada.

He moved to Britain and sang with Ted Heath and His Music in the 1940s and starred in the BBC Radio serial Riders of the Range (1949–1953) as the cowboy Jeff Arnold, where he shared the billing with his dog, Rustler (played by Percy Edwards).

As a movie actor he "made over three dozen British films in the post-war decades, most of them 'B' pictures, such as Diplomatic Passport (1954) and One Jump Ahead (1955), to which he brought an easy, likeable authority that seemed more difficult for British actors to achieve". His final (uncredited) film appearance was in the 1964 James Bond film Goldfinger where he played an American General escorting James Bond.

During 1955-1956, he starred in his only television programme, Sailor of Fortune with Lorne Greene.

Death
During rehearsals for the play The First Fish by Frank Tarloff at the Vaudeville Theatre, London, with a cast that included Moira Lister, Louie Ramsay and Ray Barrett, Carpenter arrived at the theatre and asked to be helped to a dressing room as he felt unwell. The director, Charles Ross, and the other actors were unaware he was at the theatre. He was found dead alone in the dressing room three hours later. He had recently recovered from injuries suffered in a car accident.

Partial filmography 

 This Man Is Mine (1946) – (uncredited)
 School for Secrets (1946) – Flt. Lt. Argylle
 Uneasy Terms (1948) – Windy Nicholls
 The Third Man (1949) – International Patrol D (uncredited)
 Landfall (1949) – F / O Morgan
 Albert R.N. (1953) – Fred
 Face the Music (1954) – Johnny Sutherland
 The Weak and the Wicked (1954) – Joe, Bab's boyfriend
 Night People (1954) – Eddie Whitby
 The House Across the Lake (1954) – Vincent Gordon
 The Diamond (1954) – Mickey Sweeney (uncredited)
 Johnny on the Spot (1954) – Paul Carrington
 Five Days (1954) – Paul Kirby
 Duel in the Jungle (1954) – Pan American Airways Clerk
 A Stranger Came Home (1954) – Bill Saul
 Diplomatic Passport (1954) – Ray Anderson
 The Young Lovers (1954) – Gregg Pearson
 The Sea Shall Not Have Them (1954) – Lt Patrick Boyle, Sea Otter Pilot
 Mask of Dust (1954) – Racetrack Announcer (uncredited)
 The Red Dress (1954) – Hannibal Jones (segment "Meet Mr. Jones' story)
 The Last Moment (1954) – Derwent (segment: 'The Last Moment')
 Shadow of a Man (1955) – Gene Landers
 One Jump Ahead (1955) – Paul Banner
 The Hornet's Nest (1955) – Bob Bartlett
 Doctor at Sea (1955) – Captain (uncredited)
 Stock Car (1955) – Larry Duke
 The Narrowing Circle (1956) – Dave Nelson
 Women Without Men (1956) – Nick Randall (UK version)
 The Iron Petticoat (1956) – Major Lewis
 Reach for the Sky (1956) – Hall (uncredited)
 Fire Maidens from Outer Space (1956) – Capt. Larson
 Behind the Headlines (1956) – Paul Banner
 The Battle of the River Plate (1956) – American reporter in Uruguay (uncredited)
 Action Stations (1956) - Bob Reynolds
 No Road Back (1957) – Clem Hayes
 Murder Reported (1957) – Jeff Holly – Reporter
 The Hypnotist (1957) – Valentine Neal
 Les Espions (1957) – Le Colonel Howard
 Undercover Girl (1958) – Johnny Carter
 Intent to Kill (1958) – O'Brien
 Jet Storm (1959) – George Towers
 Date at Midnight (1959) – Bob Dillon
 Wernher von Braun (1960) – Launch Countdown Coordinator (uncredited)
 Surprise Package (1960) – Television News Broadcaster (uncredited)
 Jacktown (1962) – Policeman No. 1
 Panic (1963) – Fight Commentator
 Call Me Bwana (1963) – Col. Spencer
 Dr. Crippen (1963) – Bruce Martin
 Maigret Sees Red (1963) – Harry McDonald
 The Beauty Jungle (1964) – American Tourist (uncredited)
 First Men in the Moon (1964) – Reporter from the 'Express' (uncredited)
 Goldfinger (1964) – US General at airport (uncredited) (final film role)

External links

References 

1921 births
1964 deaths
Canadian male film actors
Male actors from Montreal
20th-century Canadian male actors
Canadian expatriates in the United Kingdom